19367 Pink Floyd, provisional designation , is a dark background asteroid from the inner regions of the asteroid belt, approximately 7 kilometers in diameter. It was discovered on 3 December 1997, by European astronomers of the ODAS survey at the CERGA Observatory near Caussols, France. The asteroid was named after the English rock band Pink Floyd.

Orbit and classification 

Pink Floyd is a non-family asteroid from the background population. It orbits the Sun in the inner main-belt at a distance of 2.0–2.8 AU once every 3 years and 10 months (1,397 days). Its orbit has an eccentricity of 0.16 and an inclination of 4° with respect to the ecliptic.

Its observation arc begins 43 years prior to its official discovery observation, with a precovery taken by the Digitized Sky Survey at Palomar Observatory in July 1954.

Physical characteristics

Diameter and albedo 

According to the survey carried out by the NEOWISE mission of NASA's Wide-field Infrared Survey Explorer, Pink Floyd measures 6.652 kilometers in diameter and its surface has a low albedo of 0.048. An albedo near 0.05 is typical for carbonaceous C-type asteroids, which are the dominant type in the outer region of the main belt, but rather unusual in the inner parts. Pink Floyd has an absolute magnitude of 14.6.

Rotation period 

As of 2017, no rotational lightcurve of Pink Floyd has been obtained from photometric observations. The asteroid's rotation period, spin axis and shape remain unknown.

Naming 

This minor planet was named after the English rock band Pink Floyd, which released several astronomically themed songs such as "Interstellar Overdrive" and "Astronomy Domine". The band's album The Dark Side of the Moon (1973) became one of the best-selling records of all time.

The official naming citation was published by the Minor Planet Center on 6 August 2003.

References

External links 
Orbit diagram of (19367) Pink Floyd – Minor Planet Center
 Asteroid Lightcurve Database (LCDB), query form (info )
 Dictionary of Minor Planet Names, Google books
 Asteroids and comets rotation curves, CdR – Observatoire de Genève, Raoul Behrend
 Discovery Circumstances: Numbered Minor Planets (15001)-(20000) – Minor Planet Center
 
 

019367
019367
Named minor planets
Pink Floyd
19971203